The Free State, formerly known as the Orange Free State, is a province of South Africa. Its capital is Bloemfontein, which is also South Africa's judicial capital. Its historical origins lie in the Boer republic called the Orange Free State and later Orange Free State Province.

History

The current borders of the province date from 1994 when the Bantustans were abolished and reincorporated into South Africa. It is also the only one of the four original provinces of South Africa not to undergo border changes, apart from the reincorporation of Bantustans, and its borders date from before the outbreak of the Boer War.

Law and government

The provincial government consists of a premier, an executive council of ten ministers, and a legislature. The provincial assembly and premier are elected for five-year terms, or until the next national election. Political parties are awarded assembly seats based on the percentage of votes each party receives in the province during the national elections. The assembly elects a premier, who then appoints the members of the executive council.

The provincial legislature meets at the Vierde Raadsaal in Bloemfontein.  the premier of Free State is Mxolisi Dukwana of the African National Congress (ANC).

Geography

The Free State is situated on a succession of flat grassy plains sprinkled with pastureland, resting on a general elevation of 3,800 feet only broken by the occasional hill or kopje. The rich soil and pleasant climate allow for a thriving agricultural industry. With more than 30,000 farms, which produce over 70% of the country's grain, it is known locally as South Africa's breadbasket.

The province is high-lying, with almost all land being 1,000 metres above sea level. The Drakensberg and Maluti Mountains foothills raise the terrain to over 2,000 m in the east. The Free State lies in the heart of the Karoo Sequence of rocks, containing shales, mudstones, sandstones and the Drakensberg Basalt forming the youngest capping rocks. Mineral deposits are plentiful, with gold and diamonds being of particular importance, mostly found in the north and west of the province.

Fauna and flora
The flats in the south of the reserve provide ideal conditions for large herds of plain game such as black wildebeest and springbok. The ridges, koppies and plains typical of the northern section are home to kudu, red hartebeest, southern white rhinoceros and buffalo. The Southern African wildcat, black wildebeest, zebra, eland, white rhinoceros and wild dog can be seen at the Soetdoring Nature Reserve near Bloemfontein. The South African cheetahs were reintroduced in the Free State for the first time in June 2013 after a hundred years of regional extinction, at Laohu Valley Reserve near Philippolis. Following the reintroduction of an adult female South African cheetah in early 2016, three wild cheetah cubs were born for the first time in Laohu Valley Reserve in February 2017, making the three new cubs the first cheetahs born in the wild since their disappearance from the Free State province in over a century.

Climate
The Free State experiences a continental climate, characterised by warm to hot summers and cool to cold winters. Areas in the east experience frequent snowfalls, especially on the higher ranges, whilst the west can be extremely hot in summer. Almost all precipitation falls in the summer months as brief afternoon thunderstorms, with aridity increasing towards the west. Areas in the east around Harrismith, Bethlehem and Ficksburg are well watered. The capital, Bloemfontein, experiences hot, moist summers and cold, dry winters frequented by severe frost.
 Bloemfontein averages: January maximum: 31 °C (min: 15 °C), July maximum: 17 °C (min: -2 °C), annual precipitation: 559 mm
 Bethlehem averages: January maximum: 27 °C (min: 13 °C), July maximum: 16 °C (min: -2 °C), annual precipitation: 680 mm

Borders

In the southeast, the Free State borders seven districts of Lesotho:
Mokhotlong – farthest to the east
Butha-Buthe – northwest of Mokhotlong and northeast of Leribe
Leribe – southwest of Butha-Buthe and northeast of Berea
Berea – southwest of Leribe and north of Maseru
Maseru – south of Berea and northeast of Mafeteng
Mafeteng – southwest of Maseru and northwest of Mohale's Hoek
Mohale's Hoek – southeast of Mafeteng
Domestically, it borders the following provinces:
KwaZulu-Natal – east
Eastern Cape – south
Northern Cape – west
North West – northwest
Gauteng – north
Mpumalanga – northeast
The Free State borders more districts of Lesotho and more provinces of South Africa than any other province.

It is traversed by the northwesterly line of equal latitude and longitude.

Municipalities

The Free State Province is divided into one metropolitan municipality and four district municipalities. The district municipalities are in turn divided into 19 local municipalities:

Metropolitan municipalities

 Mangaung Metropolitan Municipality

District municipalities

 Fezile Dabi District
 Moqhaka
 Ngwathe
 Metsimaholo
 Mafube
 Lejweleputswa District
 Masilonyana
 Tokologo
 Tswelopele
 Matjhabeng
 Nala
 Thabo Mofutsanyana District
 Setsoto
 Dihlabeng
 Nketoana
 Maluti-a-Phofung
 Phumelela
 Mantsopa
 Xhariep District
 Letsemeng
 Kopanong
 Mohokare

Major cities and towns 

The Free State's major towns include:
 Bloemfontein  & Botshabelo in Mangaung Metropolitan Municipality
 Welkom, Odendaalsrus and Virginia in Lejweleputswa
 Bethlehem, Harrismith and Phuthaditjhaba in Thabo Mofutsanyana
 Kroonstad, Sasolburg and Parys in Fezile Dabi

Health
The Free State is the only province in South Africa that operates a free 24-hour dedicated rotor-wing aeromedical service from a public hospital. They are able to reach far-flung areas in only 45 minutes and deliver a high level of care on scene. On 31 October 2018, Free State Emergency Medical Service launched an additional 65 road ambulances to augment the fleet.

The Free State has many public and private hospitals.

Economy

The province is the granary of South Africa, with agriculture central to its economy, while mining on the rich goldfields reef is its largest employer.

Agriculture

Agriculture dominates the Free State landscape, with cultivated land covering 32,000 square kilometres, and natural veld and grazing a further 87,000 square kilometres of the province. It is also South Africa's leader in the production of biofuels, or fuel from agricultural crops, with a number of ethanol plants under construction in the grain-producing western region. South Africa is one of the top ten Maize producers in the world (12,365,000 tons ) whereby all of the crops come from the Free State. The Free State is well known for its Mielielande (corn-fields; the former term is in Afrikaans).

Field crops yield almost two-thirds of the gross agricultural income of the province. Animal products contribute a further 30%, with the balance generated by horticulture. Ninety percent of the country's cherry crop is produced in the Ficksburg district, which is also home to the country's two largest asparagus canning factories. Soya, sorghum, sunflowers and wheat are cultivated in the eastern Free State, where farmers specialise in seed production. About 40% of the country's potato yield comes from the province's high-lying areas.

The main vegetable crop is asparagus, both white and green varieties. Although horticulture is expanding and becoming increasingly export-orientated, most produce leaves the province unprocessed.

The Free State's advantage in floriculture is the opposing seasons of the southern and northern hemispheres. The province exports about 1.2 million tons of cut flowers a year.

Mining

The Free State is also rich in mineral wealth, gold representing 20% of the world's total gold production. Mining is the province's major employer. The province has 12 gold mines, producing 30% of South Africa's output and making it the fifth-largest producer of gold in the world. The Harmony Gold Refinery and Rand Refinery are the only two gold refineries in South Africa.

Gold mines in the Free State also supply a substantial portion of the total silver produced in the country, while considerable concentrations of uranium occurring in the gold-bearing conglomerates of the goldfields are extracted as a byproduct.

Bituminous coal is also mined, and converted to petrochemicals at Sasolburg. The Free State also produces high-quality diamonds from its kimberlite pipes and fissures, and the country's largest deposit of bentonite is found in the Koppies district.

Industry

Since 1989, the Free State economy has moved from dependence on primary sectors such as mining and agriculture to an economy increasingly oriented towards manufacturing and export. 
Some 14% of the province's manufacturing is classified as being in high-technology industries – the highest of all provincial economies. The northern Free State's chemicals sector is one of the most important in the southern hemisphere. Petrochemicals company Sasol, based in the town of Sasolburg, is a world leader in the production of fuels, waxes, chemicals and low-cost feedstock from coal.

Tourism

In the northeastern Free State, nestled in the rolling foothills of the Maluti mountains, the Golden Gate Highlands National Park is the province's prime tourist attraction. The park gets its name from the brilliant shades of gold cast by the sun on the spectacular sandstone cliffs, especially the imposing Brandwag or Sentinel Rock, which keeps vigil over the park.

The sandstone of this region has been used for the lovely dressed-stone buildings found on the Eastern Highlands, while decoratively painted Sotho houses dot the grasslands. Some of South Africa's most valued San (Bushman) rock art is found in the Free State, particularly in the regions around Clarens, Bethlehem, Ficksburg, Ladybrand and Wepener.

Demographics

Sesotho is the dominant home language in most of the province. Zulu is the major language in the far eastern municipality of Phumelela. Setswana is the main language in Tokologo in the northwest, and in and around the area of Thaba Nchu. The Free State is the only province in South Africa with a Sesotho majority. Afrikaans is widely spoken throughout the province, as a first language for the majority of whites and coloureds and as a second or third language by Sesotho, Setswana and Xhosa speakers. Although there are relatively few native English speakers, English is becoming increasingly important as the language of business and government. This is evidenced by the shift of tertiary institutions such as the University of the Free State from solely using Afrikaans as the medium of instruction to using both Afrikaans and English.

Ethnicity 
The majority of the population are black Africans who speak Sotho as a first language. The vast majority of white people in the Free State are Afrikaans-speaking. In 1880 the white population made up 45.7% of the total population. In 1904 this had fallen to 36.8%. Of the 142,679 people in 1904, only 60% were born in the province. Of the 2,726 European immigrants born in non-British states, 1,025 came from the Russian Empire, mainly Jews. In 1904 whites made up a majority in most settlements, namely Ficksburg (52.3%), Wepener (60.2%), Ladybrand (60.0%), and Kroonstad (51.6%), and made up a substantial minority in Bloemfontein (45.7%) and Winburg (36.3%).

Education

Universities
University of the Free State (Bloemfontein, Phuthaditjhaba)
Central University of Technology (Bloemfontein, Welkom)

Other educational institutions
Akademia (Bloemfontein)
Boston City Campus (Bloemfontein)
Damelin (Bloemfontein)
Flavius Mareka FET College (Kroonstad, Mphohardi, Sasolburg)
Goldfields FET College (Welkom, Tosa)
Maluti TVET College (QwaQwa, Bethlehem, Harrismith)
Motheo TVET College (Bloemfontein, Botshabelo, Thaba nchu, Koffiefontein)
Qualitas Career Academy (Bloemfontein)

Media

Newspapers
Die Volksblad (Bloemfontein)
Bloem news (Bloemfontein)
Bloemfontein Courant
Dumelang News (The People's Paper)
Express-News (Bloemfontein, Botshabelo, Thaba Nchu)
Free State Times 
Vista Newspaper (Welkom)
VrystaatKroon

Radio
OFM
Lesedi FM
Motheo FM
Radio Rosestad 100.6 FM
Kovsie FM
CUT FM
104.1 MedFM

Sports

Provincial sport teams
Soccer
African Warriors (Phuthaditjhaba)
Carara Kicks F.C. (Welkom)
Bloemfontein Celtic (Bloemfontein)
Free State Stars (Bethlehem)
Roses United
Bloemfontein Young Tigers
Rugby
Cheetahs (Bloemfontein) – also represents Northern Cape
Currie Cup:
Free State Cheetahs (Bloemfontein)
Griffons (Welkom)
Cricket
Knights (Bloemfontein)

See also
List of speakers of the Free State Provincial Legislature

References

External links

 Free State Provincial Government
 Free State Tourism Authority
 

 
English-speaking countries and territories
Provinces of South Africa
States and territories established in 1994
1994 establishments in South Africa